Maggie Nurrenbern is currently serving as a member of the Missouri House of Representatives from the 15th district, representing portions of Kansas City. A Democrat, she has served since 2021.

Missouri House of Representatives

Committee assignments 

 Budget
 Elementary and Secondary Education
 Subcommittee on Appropriations - General Administration

Electoral history

References 

Women state legislators in Missouri
Living people
Year of birth missing (living people)
Democratic Party members of the Missouri House of Representatives
21st-century American women